Bardiya District, one of the seventy-seven Districts of Nepal, is part of Lumbini Province of Nepal.

Geography and climate
Bardiya lies in Lumbini Province in midwestern Nepal.  It covers 2025 square kilometers and lies west of Banke District, south of Surkhet District of Karnali Province, east of Kailali District of Sudurpashchim province. To the south lies Uttar Pradesh, India.

Most of Bardiya is in the fertile Terai plains, covered with agricultural land and forest.  The northernmost part of the district extends into the Churiya or Siwalik Hills. Bardiya National Park covers  occupies most of the northern half of the district. This park is the largest undisturbed wilderness in Nepal's Terai.  It provides forest, grassland and riverine habitat for endangered mammal, bird and reptile species.  More than 30 species of mammals and more than 250 of birds have been recorded.

Most people living in this district are farmers. The district headquarter Gulariya lies on the Babai River. The Karnali, one of Nepal's largest rivers, divided into multiple branches when it reaches the Terai.  The westernmost branch forms the boundary between Bardiya and Kailali districts. An eastern branch is called the Geruwa. The endangered Gangetic dolphin was often seen in its waters, but populations have been declining.

History
Nepal lost it to the East India Company after Anglo-Nepalese war (1814–1816) between the then Kingdom of Nepal and East India Company followed by territorial concessions of Sugauli Treaty. Later during the administration of Jang Bahadur Rana, it was returned to Nepal along with Banke, Kailali and Kanchanpur.  In the early twentieth century, Bardiya was still covered with forest and sparsely populated with indigenous tribal people called Tharu. Additional Tharus immigrated west from Dang and Deukhuri Valleys. Tharu from Dang and Deukhuri make up a majority of Bardiya's population. Other tribes called Sonaha live near the Karnali River and western periphery of Bardia National Park, who are historically engaged in extracting golden ores from sediments of river and fishing.

Demographics
At the time of the 2011 Nepal census, Bardiya District had a population of 426,576. Of these, 52.3% spoke Tharu, 35.2% Nepali, 7.2% Awadhi, 2.3% Urdu, 0.7% Magar, 0.4% Hindi, 0.4% Maithili, 0.3% Bhojpuri, 0.3% Gurung, 0.2% Newar, 0.2% Raji, 0.1% Doteli, 0.1% Sonaha, 0.1% Tamang, and 0.1% other languages as their first language.

In terms of ethnicity/caste, 53.3% were Tharu, 11.3% Chhetri, 8.7% Hill Brahmin, 5.7% Kami, 2.9% Magar, 2.6% Musalman, 2.3% Thakuri, 1.9% Yadav, 1.8% Damai/Dholi, 1.1% Mallaha, 0.9% Lodh, 0.8% Chamar/Harijan/Ram, 0.7% Gurung, 0.7% Sanyasi/Dasnami, 0.6% Newar, 0.6% Sarki, 0.3% Dusadh/Pasawan/Pasi, 0.3% Kurmi, 0.3% Tamang, 0.3% other Terai, 0.2% Badi, 0.2% Terai Brahmin, 0.2% other Dalit, 0.2% Dhobi, 0.2% Hajam/Thakur, 0.2% Halwai, 0.2% Kathabaniyan, 0.2% Lohar, 0.2% Raji, 0.1% Bengali, 0.1% Gaine, 0.1% Kayastha, 0.1% Koiri/Kushwaha, 0.1% Kumal, 0.1% Rajbanshi, 0.1% Teli and 0.1% others.

In terms of religion, 94.2% were Hindu, 2.6% Muslim, 2.2% Christian and 1.0% Buddhist.

In terms of literacy, 65.2% could read and write, 1.9% could only read and 32.9% could neither read nor write.

Administration
The district consists of eight municipalities, out of which six are urban municipalities and two are rural municipalities. These are as follows:
Gulariya municipality
Rajapur municipality
Madhuwan municipality
Thakurbaba municipality
Basgadhi municipality
Barbardiya municipality
Badhaiyatal rural municipality
Geruwa rural municipality

Former village development committees
Prior to the restructuring of the district, Bardiya District consisted of the following municipalities and Village development committees:

Badalpur Nepal
Baganaha
Baniyabhar
Belawa
Bhimapur
Deudakala
Dhadhawar
Dhodhari
Gola
Jamuni
Kalika
Khairapur
Khairi Chandanpur
Magaragadi
Mahamadpur
Manau
Manpur Mainapokhar
Manpur Tapara
Mathurahardwar
Motipur
Naya Gaun
Neulapur
Padanaha
Pasupatinagar
Patabhar
Sanesri
Shivapur
Sorhawa
Suryapatawa
Taratal
Thakudwara

See also
Zones of Nepal

References

 
Districts of Nepal established during Rana regime or before